Broadbridge may refer to :
 Broadbridge (surname)
 Baron Broadbridge, title in the Peerage of the United Kingdom
 Broadbridge Heath, village in West Sussex, England